In mathematics, an affine algebraic group is said to be diagonalizable if it is isomorphic to a subgroup of Dn, the group of diagonal matrices. A diagonalizable group defined over a field k is said to split over k or k-split if the isomorphism is defined over k. This coincides with the usual notion of split for an algebraic group. Every diagonalizable group splits over the separable closure ks of k. Any closed subgroup and image of diagonalizable groups are diagonalizable. The torsion subgroup of a diagonalizable group is dense.

The category of diagonalizable groups defined over k is equivalent to the category of finitely generated abelian groups with Gal(ks/k)-equivariant morphisms without p-torsion, if k is of characteristic p. This is an analog of Poincaré duality and motivated the terminology.

A diagonalizable k-group is said to be anisotropic if it has no nontrivial k-valued character.

The so-called "rigidity" states that the identity component of the centralizer of a diagonalizable group coincides with the identity component of the normalizer of the group. The fact plays a crucial role in the structure theory of solvable groups.

A connected diagonalizable group is called an algebraic torus (which is not necessarily compact, in contrast to a complex torus). A k-torus is a torus defined over k. The centralizer of a maximal torus is called a Cartan subgroup.

See also 
Diagonal subgroup

References 

 Borel, A. Linear algebraic groups, 2nd ed.

Algebraic groups